Mortemer may refer to the following places in France:

 Mortemer, Oise, Picardy
 Mortemer, Seine-Maritime, Haute-Normandie
 Mortemer Abbey, a former Cistercian monastery in the Eure department, Haute-Normandie